The Power of Women was an early American television program broadcast on the DuMont Television Network. The series ran from July to November of 1952. This thirty-minute-long series  was a public affairs program originally hosted by Vivien Kellems. Kellems would leave partway through the series' run.

The program, produced and distributed by DuMont, aired Mondays at 8pm ET on most DuMont affiliates. The last episode was broadcast on November 11, 1952, replaced by popular quiz show Twenty Questions.

The Power of Women originated at WABD-TV in New York City and was sustaining. Duncan MacDonald was the producer, and Wesley Kenney was the director.

See also
List of programs broadcast by the DuMont Television Network
List of surviving DuMont Television Network broadcasts
1952-53 United States network television schedule

References

Bibliography
David Weinstein, The Forgotten Network: DuMont and the Birth of American Television (Philadelphia: Temple University Press, 2004) 
Tim Brooks and Earle Marsh, The Complete Directory to Prime Time Network TV Shows, Third edition (New York: Ballantine Books, 1964)

External links
DuMont historical website

DuMont Television Network original programming
1952 American television series debuts
1952 American television series endings
Black-and-white American television shows
Lost television shows